was a Japanese lawyer and Home Ministry and Police Bureau government official. He was born in Fukushima Prefecture. He was a graduate of the University of Tokyo. He was governor of Yamanashi Prefecture (1941–1942) and Hiroshima Prefecture from June 10 to October 11, 1945. Following the atomic attack on Hiroshima, Takano took part in the initial rescue work. On October 11, 1945, his term as governor of Hiroshima expired and he was appointed police officer, but was removed from that position in January 1946 by American occupation authorities due to the policy of purging public officials who served during World War II. Later, he worked as a private lawyer.

He died of pneumonia.

References
 Robert Jungk, Children of the Ashes (1st English ed. 1961)
 Yoshiteru Kosakai, A-Bomb: A City Tells its Story (Hiroshima 1972)
 Yoshiteru Kosakai, Hiroshima Peace Reader (1st English ed. 1980)

External links
 Letters written by governor at time of A-bombing found

1895 births
1969 deaths
20th-century Japanese politicians
Governors of Hiroshima
Hibakusha
Japanese Home Ministry government officials
Japanese Police Bureau government officials
Governors of Yamanashi Prefecture
University of Tokyo alumni
20th-century Japanese lawyers
Politicians from Fukushima Prefecture
Deaths from pneumonia in Japan